Lemuropisum (lemur's pea) is a genus of flowering plants in the legume family, Fabaceae. It belongs to the subfamily Caesalpinioideae.

Selected species
Lemuropisum edule - Madagascar

References

Caesalpinioideae
Fabaceae genera